King's Highway 427 (pronounced "four twenty-seven"), also known as Highway 427 and colloquially as the 427, is a 400-series highway in the Canadian province of Ontario that runs from the Queen Elizabeth Way (QEW) and Gardiner Expressway in Toronto to Major Mackenzie Drive (York Regional Road25) in Vaughan. It is Ontario's second busiest freeway by volume and the third busiest in North America, behind Highway401 and Interstate 405 in California.
Like Highway401, a portion of the route is divided into a collector-express system with twelve to fourteen continuous lanes. Notable about Highway427 are its several multi-level interchanges; the junctions with the QEW/Gardiner Expressway and Highway401 are two of the largest interchanges in Ontario and were constructed between 1967 and 1971, while the interchanges with Highway 409 and Highway 407 were completed in 1992 and 1995, respectively.

Highway427 is the main feeder to Toronto Pearson International Airport from the north and south. However, while much of the traffic from Highway407, Highway401 (eastbound), and the QEW/Gardiner Expressway makes use of the freeway for airport access, it also serves as a major traffic route for the western portion of Toronto (Etobicoke), the northeastern portion of Mississauga (Malton), the southeastern portion of Brampton (Claireville), and the western portion of Vaughan (Woodbridge). The section between Highway 401 and Dundas Street is a heavily traversed transit corridor; the  stretch between Burnhamthorpe and Rathburn saw an average of over 400,000 vehicles and over 5,000 buses per day in 2016.
GO Transit, MiWay, and the Toronto Transit Commission (TTC) all operate express buses along this section of the highway.

First designated in 1972, Highway427 assumed the recently completed 12-lane collector-express freeway of Highway 27, as well as a short freeway north of Highway401 known as the Airport Expressway. Both routes were upgraded throughout the 1950s and 1960s, eventually becoming intertwined into the present configuration in 1972. The freeway was extended north from Pearson Airport to Highway7 over the following twenty years. Construction of an extension north to York Regional Road 25 (Major Mackenzie Drive) began in 2017 and was opened on September18, 2021, following a legal dispute between the construction consortium and the provincial government.

Route description 

Highway 427 is the second-busiest freeway in Canada with an average of 300,000 vehicles that use it between the QEW and Highway401 per day. The section between Burnhamthorpe Road and Rathburn Road has an annual average daily traffic (AADT) count of 353,100.

At its southern terminus, the route begins at Coules Court, where it continues as Brown's Line, once the southernmost stretch of Highway27. Alderwood Plaza, located on the east side of the route, has a parking lot which provides access to the highway; this is the only at-grade access along the length of the route. The four-lane road splits into a divided highway and descends below Evans Avenue. The highway weaves through a complicated interchange, providing northbound access to Evans Avenue and the Gardiner Expressway, and southbound access to The Queensway, QEW/Gardiner Expressway, and Evans Avenue. North of the interchange, the lanes from Brown's Line diverge and form the collector lanes of a collector-express system. Flyover ramps to and from the QEW/Gardiner pass over the southbound lanes and converge to form the express lanes. This collector-express system serves to divide local traffic from freeway-to-freeway traffic; the express lanes provide access between the QEW/Gardiner Expressway and Highway401, while the collector lanes provide local access between those interchanges.

After crossing Canadian Pacific Railway (CPR) tracks, the freeway interchanges with Dundas Street (former Highway 5). A set of criss-crossing ramps provide access between the collector and express lanes north of this point, referred to as "The Basketweave," with the northbound express-to-collector transfer also having an offramp to Dundas Street. North of Dundas, the highway has a northbound right-in/right-out (RIRO) interchange with Gibbs Road, the first of several that provide collector lane access to minor streets that mostly connect to The East Mall and The West Mall, which run parallel with the collector-express section of the freeway. The highway passes beneath Bloor Street but has no interchange with it. A full interchange is provided shortly after with Burnhamthorpe Road, southwest of Burnhamthorpe Collegiate Institute. Across from the school, another RIRO provides access from the southbound lanes to Holiday Drive and The West Mall. Following the off-ramp, to the north, is a half-cloverleaf interchange with Rathburn Road, which provides access from the northbound lanes and to the southbound lanes.

Transfers provide a second and final opportunity to cross between the express and collector lanes, or vice versa, south of the complicated  Highway401 interchange. A final RIRO provides southbound access to and from Eringate Drive, after which the collector lanes diverge, and the express lanes cross the southbound collectors. The collector lanes cross Eglinton Avenue at a half-cloverleaf interchange and then dives under Highway401 while transitioning into Highway27, while the express lanes interchange with Highway401 and continue the route of Highway 427. The Highway 427 express lanes and ramps connecting to Highway 401 are constructed around the Richview Memorial Cemetery.
There are no ramps to provide access from southbound Highway427 to eastbound Highway401 and vice versa, as this connection is handled by Highway 409. Highway 427 crosses Renforth Drive and then curves to the east of Runway24R and 24L of Toronto Pearson International Airport.
Shortly thereafter, it crosses and interchanges with Dixon Road and Airport Road, between which it forms the demarcation line. Several ramps diverge at this point to provide access to Pearson Airport, and the freeway narrows to eight lanes.

From here to just south of Finch Avenue, the freeway follows the boundary line between Toronto and Mississauga. It encounters the third multi-level junction along its length, with Highway409, which provides access to the airport as well as the southbound to eastbound movement that cannot be performed at the interchange with Highway401 to the south. Highway427 continues straight north and narrows again to six lanes. After crossing the Kitchener GO line, it passes west of Woodbine Racetrack and interchanges with Rexdale Boulevard/Derry Road and Finch Avenue. The freeway bends slightly eastward, diverging from the Toronto/Mississauga boundary to briefly run exclusively through Toronto again. It crosses the West Humber River where it drains from Claireville Reservoir. The highway crosses Steeles Avenue and enters Vaughan, as it approaches a fourth and final sprawling interchange with Highway407.
It then interchanges with Highway 7 (York Regional Road 7), Langstaff Road (Regional Road 72), Rutherford Road (Regional Road 73), and ends at a trumpet interchange with Major MacKenzie Drive(Regional Road 25).

History

QEW to Highway 401 (1953–1956) 

Although Highway 427 was not officially designated until 1972, several sections of freeway were already in place prior to that date. The designation was applied following the completion of the interchanges at the QEW and Highway401 as well as the expansion of the section between them into a collector-express system.

Highway27 was designated as a two-lane road travelling north from Highway 2 (Lake Shore Boulevard) towards Barrie. As Toronto grew outwards following the annexation of various municipalities, the Ontario Department of Highways (DHO) began planning for a bypass of the city, aptly named the Toronto Bypass. A significant portion of this bypass was designed to be incorporated into the Transprovincial Highway, now Highway401. The remainder was designed to follow the existing right-of-way of Highway27 between the QEW and Richview Sideroad (now Eglinton Avenue).

Construction of the Toronto Bypass began near Yonge Street in 1949 (along present-day Highway401) and on the four-laning of Highway27 in 1953.
The Highway27 work involved the construction of two interchanges: a three-way stack at Highway401 and a large cloverleaf at the QEW, the latter of which would become one of the worst bottlenecks in the province a decade after its completion, according to Minister of Transportation Charles MacNaughton. By September 1956, it was possible to bypass Toronto entirely on the four lane divided highway composed of Highway401 and Highway27.
Highway401 was extended to the west soon after,
but Highway27 remained a two-lane highway north of it.

Airport Expressway (1964–1971) 
During the early 1960s, Toronto International Airport was expanded with the construction of the Aeroquay One terminal. To serve the expected demand of the expansion, the DHO built a new four-lane freeway north from Highway401 at Renforth Drive. This new route, which roughly followed the same route as today's Highway 427 as far as Dixon/Airport Roads where it tied in with and downgraded into Indian Line, was known as the Toronto Airport Expressway and was opened on January 3, 1964.
It featured a connection with the western terminus of Richview Sideroad at the southern end of the interchange with Highway401 as well as an interchange with Renforth Drive.

Expansion (1963–1971) 

In 1963, MacNaughton announced that Highway 401 would be widened from a four-lane highway to a collector-express system, modelled after the Dan Ryan Expressway in Chicago. Plans were soon developed to apply this model to the QEW between Highway27 and Royal York Road and to Highway27 between the QEW and Highway401, and were unveiled to Etobicoke council on October13, 1966.
Design work followed and was completed by May 1967.
This reconstruction once again involved the junctions with the QEW and Highway401, which were reconfigured into complicated multi-level interchanges to permit free-flow movement; construction began in September 1968.
The widening of Highway27 required the demolition and rebuilding of overpasses at Bloor Street, Burnhamthorpe Road, and Rathburn Road constructed just over a decade earlier.

Construction began in September 1968, although preliminary work had been ongoing since 1966;
the interchange opened to traffic on November14, 1969.

The interchange with the QEW was opened to traffic on November14, 1969,
while the Highway401 junction required several more years of construction staging, fully opening on December4, 1971 (though portions were opened in the weeks prior to that),
just prior to Highway27's renumbering as Highway427. The rest of the route was rebuilt prior to the completion of these interchanges.

The completed project resulted in the creation of Highway427 between the QEW and Dixon/Airport Road, north of which traffic was defaulted onto Indian Line. The entire existing Airport Expressway was removed to make way for the new interchange with Highway401, but its replacement in the form of the Highway427 extension (also known as the Airport Expressway) still included direct access to the airport. An off-ramp from westbound Highway401 to Carlingview Drive was temporarily signed as "Airport Expressway", since Carlingview Drive had a temporary on-ramp to northbound Highway427 near the Renforth Drive Underpass but that on-ramp was closed in the early 1970s.  Direct access from westbound Highway401 to northbound Highway427 would be restored a few years later once Highway 409 opened.

Extensions beyond Highway 401 (1976–1994) 
 
Ultimately, it was planned to extend Highway427 north along Indian Line (although a  stretch of that road would be retained to maintain access to driveways)
to the future Highway407, where ramps would direct northbound traffic onto Highway27. An extension north of Dixon/Airport Roads began in 1976 as part of the work to build Highway409,
and it included the construction of the interchange between the two freeways. By the beginning of 1980, this work was completed, and construction was progressing on the section north to Rexdale Boulevard, which opened by the end of the year.
In 1982, construction began on the next section of Highway427, which would extend it to south of Albion Road (which was reached via the northernmost stretch of Indian Line) north of the West Humber River.
This project included the extension of Finch Avenue west from Humberline Drive to Steeles Avenue and was completed in late 1984.

As part of the initial phase of Highway407, Highway427 was extended north to Highway7 in Vaughan beginning with the construction of the interchange between the two in 1988.
With the interchange only half-completed, the extension was opened in late 1991.
By 1994, the final at-grade intersections—the first being the signalized left turn from the southbound lanes with eastbound Highway409 which was replaced by a flyover ramp, and the second being at Morning Star Drive, where an overpass was constructed to extend the street across the freeway to Humberwood Boulevard—were removed, making Highway427 a fully controlled-access freeway for its entire length.

Upgrades since 1990s 

In 2001-02, modifications were made to the interchange with the QEW and Gardiner Expressway. This included a new loop ramp from the Highway427 southbound collectors to the Gardiner, aimed at relieving the congestion in the express lanes created by the southbound collector-to-express transfer near Bloor Street, as the collector lanes originally lacked direct access to the Toronto-bound QEW (downloaded from the province in 1998 to become the part of the Gardiner). The Gardiner Expressway also received an off-ramp to Sherway Gardens, which necessitated an underpass to be implemented in the directional ramp from the Highway427 southbound express to the Hamilton-bound QEW.

Arterial extension and widening (2008–2021)
 An  four-lane arterial road designated as Regional Road 99 was opened in the autumn of 2008 by York Region. This road unofficially extended Highway427's northern terminus from Highway7 to a signalized intersection with Zenway Boulevard, and mainly served to provide improved access to Highway27 and Highway 50. York Regional Road99 was permanently closed on August8, 2020, to make way for the extension of Highway427 northwards to Major MacKenzie Drive (Regional Road 25), which also involved constructing an overpass for Zenway Boulevard to cross the extended freeway.

A section of Highway427 between Campus Road-Fasken Drive and Highway 7 was expanded to four lanes in each direction.
This project included the installation of high-mast lighting, median barriers, and the addition of high-occupancy toll lanes (HOT) in both directions, and was completed in 2021 in conjunction with the Vaughan Extension (see below). One of the challenges during this project was widening the Highway 427 bridges crossing Highway 407 ETR, with the solution being steel box girders added on either side of the existing post-tensioned concrete structures, as opposed to the conventional bridge widening practice of the expansion using a similar construction to the original bridge since post-tensioned concrete additions require falsework which in turn would close down Highway 407 ETR lanes for extended periods.  The completed HOT lanes strech from south of Highway 409 to north of Rutherford Road. In conjunction with the widening work, and in anticipation of the opening of the extension north of Highway 7, exit numbers were added (still ongoing as of late 2021), starting with the northern sections of the highway.

Vaughan Extension (2017–2021) 

An environmental assessment was completed on a northward extension of Highway427 to Major Mackenzie Drive to relieve traffic issues on Regional Road27 and 50, as well as provide improved access to the Canadian Pacific Intermodal Terminal,
with construction beginning in May 2017.
The project included HOT lanes as far north as Rutherford Road, and was scheduled to open in 2021, with the HOT lanes opening the following year.
However, a pending legal dispute between the provincial government and the constructor delayed the opening of the extension in late April 2021.

The extension was built by Link 427, a consortium of six companies that tendered the winning bid to Infrastructure Ontario,
The project was estimated at a cost of $616 million,
and included the design, financing, and construction of the extension, as well as its maintenance for thirty years.
Construction required the periodic closure of eleven roads, and the permanent closure of Regional Road99. McGillivray Road was realigned at Rutherford Road, as was the intersection of Huntington Road and Major Mackenzie Drive.
The extension north to Major Mackenzie Drive opened on September18, 2021, after the legal dispute was settled.

Future 
There is a planned extension that would see the freeway pushed north to near Bolton to meet the proposed Highway 413, should that highway be constructed.
The Highway427 Extension Transportation Needs Assessment Study examined further extensions; connections with the Bradford Bypass freeway, as well as Highway 400 and Highway 11 north of Barrie were considered.  In the past decade, there has been little discussion of this highway extension due to concerns with traversing the Oak Ridges Moraine and Minesing Wetlands.

Exit list

See also 
Highway 427 BRT

References

Sources

Bibliography

External links 

Highway 427 Corridor Environmental Assessment
Lost Road: Indian Line Road
Highway 427 pictures and information
Drone footage showing the progress of construction as of July 2019

27
Roads at Toronto Pearson International Airport
Roads in Mississauga
Roads in the Regional Municipality of York
Toronto highways
Proposed roads in Canada